Sean Levey (born 7 March, 1988) is a Swazi born, Classic-winning jockey based in the United Kingdom.

Early life
Levey was born in Swaziland (now Eswatini) to an Irish father, jockey and trainer Mick Levey, and a Swazi mother, Tini. In 2001 the family moved to County Tipperary, Ireland, where his parents worked at Ballydoyle for trainer Aidan O'Brien. Levey rode out for O'Brien and, together with his brother Declan, spent a year on the pony racing circuit.

Racing career

After competing in pony racing, Levey then spent six years as an apprentice jockey with O'Brien at Ballydoyle where he was given the chance to ride pacemakers in Group 1 races, including the Irish Classics and the Prix de l'Arc de Triomphe in France. By the time he left Ireland he had ridden 45 winners including a Group and three Listed victories, but had still not ridden out his claim, due to a lack of opportunities in handicaps.

In 2011 Levey moved to England, first to the stables of David O'Meara near York and then to the stables of Richard Hannon near Marlborough, Wiltshire, where he has remained.

Levey had his first Derby ride in 2016 on Humphrey Bogart, on whom he had won the Lingfield Derby Trial in May. The pair achieved fifth place in the Derby.
 He won his first Group 1 race in May 2018, when he rode Richard Hannon-trained filly Billesdon Brook to victory in the 1000 Guineas at Newmarket. At 66-1 she was the longest priced winner in the history of the race. Levey said: "It feels great. I've been working a long time to get to this moment and I'm glad it's come. I didn't expect it today. I thought she deserved the chance to be here and run well but to win it the way she did, it wasn't one of my expectations." It was the first time a black jockey had won a British Classic Race.

In June 2018 Levey sustained a shoulder injury when he was unseated at Salisbury and, following surgery, was unable to ride for the rest of the season.

The 2019 season brought two more Group 1 victories for Levey. In October he won the Sun Chariot Stakes at Newmarket on board Billesdon Brook and the Queen Elizabeth II Stakes at Ascot with King of Change, on whom he had come second in the 2000 Guineas at odds of 66/1. In November Levey had his first ride in the Breeders' Cup at Santa Anita in California, partnering Billesdon Brook in the Filly & Mare Turf. The four-year-old finished in eighth place behind Iridessa 

In 2021, Levey won another Group 1 race this time in the Falmouth Stakes at Newmarket with Snow Lantern. Following a stewards enquiry at Glorious Goodwood, Levey was forced to miss the Ebor Festival at York.

In 2022, Levey won his first Group 1 race in France partnering Aristia to victory in the Prix Jean Romanet at Deauville. He competed in the Racing League, and finished second to Saffie Osborne. He had been leading before the final event of the competition but was stood down from his rides due to medical reasons. Days later, the BHA confirmed Levey had initially failed a saliva test but passed on his second sample, and was therefore cleared of any wrong doing and reinstated to compete in races.

Major wins
 United Kingdom
 1000 Guineas Stakes - (1) - Billesdon Brook (2018)
 Queen Elizabeth II Stakes - (1) - King of Change (2018)
 Sun Chariot Stakes - (1) - Billesdon Brook (2018)
Falmouth Stakes - (1) - Snow Lantern (2021) 

 France
 Prix Jean Romanet - (1) - Aristia (2022)

References 

1988 births
Living people
Irish jockeys
Swazi_expatriate_sportspeople